The following is a list of fleets of navies from around the world.

Australian fleet
Fleet Base East
Fleet Base West

Canadian fleets
Commander, Canadian Fleet Atlantic (Maritime Forces Atlantic) (HQ Halifax, Nova Scotia)
Commander, Canadian Fleet Pacific (Maritime Forces Pacific) (HQ Esquimalt, British Columbia)

Chinese fleets

Historic
Chinese treasure fleet
Beiyang Fleet
Nanyang Fleet

Modern People's Liberation Army Navy fleets
East Sea Fleet
North Sea Fleet
South Sea Fleet

French fleets 
French Atlantic Fleet (HQ Brest)
French Mediterranean Fleet (HQ Toulon)
French American Squadron (HQ Martinique)
French Indian Ocean Squadron (HQ Réunion)
French Pacific Fleet (HQ Papeete)
French Channel Squadron (HQ Brest)

German fleets 
 High Seas Fleet historic

Indian fleets

Naval Commands
 Western Naval Command
 Eastern Naval Command
 Southern Naval Command

Fleets
 Western Fleet
 Eastern Fleet

Indonesian fleets 
1st Fleet Command (HQ Jakarta)
2nd Fleet Command (HQ Surabaya)
3rd Fleet Command (HQ Sorong)

Iranian fleets 

 Northern Fleet (Iran)
 Southern Fleet (Iran)

Japanese fleets

Pre World War I
 Combined Fleet (聯合艦隊 Rengō Kantai?)
 1st Fleet (HQ Hashira-jima, Yamaguchi)
 2nd Fleet
 3rd Fleet (HQ Babeldaob, Palau)
 4th Fleet (HQ Truk, Micronesia)
 Eastern Fleet (東部艦隊 Tōbu-Kantai?)
 Guard Fleet (警備艦隊 Keibi Kantai?)
 Medium Fleet (中艦隊 Chū-Kantai?)
 Northern Expeditionary Fleet (北伐艦隊 Hokubatsu Kantai?)
 Small Fleet (小艦隊 Shō-Kantai?)
 Western Fleet (西部艦隊 Seibu-Kantai?)

World War I
 Combined Fleet (聯合艦隊 Rengō Kantai?)
 1st Fleet
 2nd Fleet
 3rd Fleet

World War II 
 Combined Fleet, the main combatant component of the Imperial Japanese Navy during World War II.
 1st Fleet (HQ Hashira-jima, Yamaguchi)
 2nd Fleet
 3rd Fleet (HQ Babeldaob, Palau)
 4th Fleet (HQ Truk, Micronesia)
 5th Fleet
 6th Fleet (HQ Kwajalein, Marshall Islands)
 Southern Expeditionary Fleet
 10th Area Fleet
 Central Pacific Area Fleet 
 China Area Fleet, tasked with guarding the Chinese coastal area, had the same organizational level as the Combined Fleet
 Northeast Area Fleet
 Southeast Area Fleet

Modern Day 
 Self Defense Fleet, the main combatant component of the Japan Maritime Self-Defense Force.

North Korean fleets 
 East Coast Fleet headquartered at Toejo
 West Coast Fleet headquartered at Nampo

Portuguese fleets 
 Portuguese 1807 Fleet
 Portuguese Navy

Russian or Soviet fleets

Active fleets
 Baltic Fleet
 Black Sea Fleet
 Caspian Flotilla
 Russian Northern Fleet
 Pacific Ocean Fleet (Russia)

Inactive fleets, Soviet and Russian
 Amur Military Flotilla
 Arctic Sea Flotilla
 Soviet Red Banner Northern Fleet

South Korean fleets 
 Republic of Korea First Fleet (Headquarters Donghae) East Sea
 Republic of Korea Second Fleet (Headquarters Pyeongtaek) Yellow Sea
 Republic of Korea Third Fleet (Headquarters Mokpo) South Sea
 Submarine Force (HQ Jinhae, Jeju)
 Component Flotilla FIVE (Headquarters Jinhae)
 Mobile Flotilla SEVEN (Headquarters Jeju)
 Mobile Squadron SEVEN ONE
 Mobile Squadron SEVEN TWO
 Fleet Combat Training Group EIGHT (Headquarters Jinhae)

Saudi Arabian fleets 

 Eastern Fleet (Saudi Arabia)
 Western Fleet (Saudi Arabia)

Spanish fleets

Spanish 
 Spanish treasure fleet (HQ Seville)
 Manila galleon (HQ Manila)
 New Spain fleet (HQ Havana)
 Royal Galley Fleet (HQ Cartagena and Naples)

Modern Day 
 La Flota (The Fleet), the main combatant component of the Spanish Navy (HQ Rota)
 Canary Islands squadron (HQ Las Palmas)
 Submarine flotilla (HQ Cartagena)

Swedish fleets 
 Coastal Fleet

Turkish fleets 
Turkish Fleet Command
Northern Sea Area Command, İstanbul
Istanbul Strait Command, Anadolukavağı, İstanbul
Çanakkale Strait Command, Nara, Çanakkale
Black Sea Area Command, Karadeniz Ereğli, Zonguldak
Underwater Search and Rescue Group Command, Beykoz, İstanbul
Rescue Group Command
Underwater Defence Group Command
Naval Hydrography and Oceanography Division Command, Çubuklu, İstanbul
Bartın Naval Base Command, Bartın
Naval Museum Command, Beşiktaş, İstanbul
Istanbul Naval Shipyard Command, Pendik
Southern Sea Area Command, İzmir
Amphibious Task Group Command, Foça, İzmir
Amphibious Marine Brigade Command, Foça, İzmir
Amphibious Ships Command, Foça, İzmir
Aksaz Naval Base Command, Aksaz Naval Base, Marmaris
Mediterranean Area Command, Mersin
İskenderun Naval Base Command, İskenderun, Hatay
Agean Sea Area Command, İzmir
Foça Naval Base Command, Foça, İzmir
Maintenance, Repair and Engineering Command, İzmir

United Kingdom fleets

Pre World War I 
 Atlantic Fleet Atlantic Ocean, English Channel
 Baltic Fleet, Baltic Sea
 Channel Fleet English Channel
 Downs Station Southern, North Sea
 Irish Fleet Irish Sea
 North Sea Fleet North Sea
 Reserve Fleet

World War I 
 Battle Cruiser Fleet North Sea
 First Fleet
 Grand Fleet (HQ Scapa Flow, Orkney, Scotland) North Sea
 Mediterranean Fleet (HQ Malta) Mediterranean Sea
 Second Fleet
 Third Fleet
 Reserve Fleet

World War II 
 Home Fleet (HQ Scapa Flow, Orkney, Scotland) North Sea
 Mediterranean Fleet (HQ Alexandria, Egypt) Mediterranean Sea
 Eastern Fleet (HQ Trincomalee, Ceylon) Indian Ocean
 British Pacific Fleet (HQ Sydney, Australia) South West Pacific
 East Indies Fleet, (HQ Trincomalee, Ceylon) Indian Ocean
 Reserve Fleet

Post World War II 
 East Indies Fleet (HQ Trincomalee, Ceylon) Indian Ocean
Far East Fleet (HQ Singapore) (to 1971)
 Reserve Fleet
Western Fleet (HQ Northwood, England) (1967–71)
Commander-in-Chief Fleet (1971–2002)

After 2002 a four-star commander-in-chief ceased to be appointed and the responsibilities of the post were transferred to the three-star Fleet Commander.

United States fleets

Naval commands
 United States Fleet Forces Command (formerly Atlantic Fleet)
 United States Naval Forces Central Command
 United States Naval Forces Europe - Naval Forces Africa
 
 United States Pacific Fleet

Modern US Navy fleets
US Navy fleets are numbered odd in the Pacific or West, and even in the Atlantic or East:
 United States Second Fleet (HQ Norfolk, Virginia) North Atlantic Ocean, Arctic Ocean, & Homeland Defense.
 United States Third Fleet (HQ San Diego, California) East Pacific
 United States Fourth Fleet (HQ Mayport, Florida) South Atlantic
 United States Fifth Fleet (HQ Manama, Bahrain) Middle East
 United States Sixth Fleet (HQ Naples, Italy) Europe, including Mediterranean Sea & Black Sea.
 United States Seventh Fleet (HQ Yokosuka, Japan) West Pacific
 United States Tenth Fleet (HQ Fort Meade, Maryland) Reactivated as Fleet Cyber Command. Formerly anti submarine warfare coordinating organization.

Inactive and historic
 United States First Fleet
 United States Eighth Fleet
 United States Ninth Fleet
 United States Eleventh Fleet
 United States Twelfth Fleet
 United States Asiatic Fleet historic
 United States Navy Reserve Fleets
 Great White Fleet nickname for the United States Atlantic Fleet sent around the world by President Theodore Roosevelt in 1908
 Great Green Fleet nickname for the United States ships or current carrier strike group sent around the world to promote a new bio-energy sustainable fuel
 East India Squadron
 European Squadron
 North Atlantic Fleet
 Mediterranean Squadron
 Scouting Fleet
 South Atlantic Squadron

Informal fleet names
 Spanish Armada name used in England to describe the fleet assembled by Philip II of Spain for the invasion of England

Fleets